Lapakahi State Historical Park is a large area of ruins from an Ancient Hawaiian fishing village in the North Kohala District on the Big Island of Hawaii. Offshore is the Lapakahi Marine Life Conservation District.

The name lapa kahi means "single ridge" in the Hawaiian Language, and applied to the ahupuaa, an ancient land division that ran from the sea up to Kohala Mountain. It is state archaeological site 10-02-2245, and was added to the National Register of Historic Places on July 2, 1973, as site 73000654. Just to the north, Māhukona Beach Park is on a bay where raw sugar from a local sugar mill was shipped to San Francisco.

References

Protected areas of Hawaii (island)
Hawaiian religion
Hawaiian architecture
Properties of religious function on the National Register of Historic Places in Hawaii
Historic districts on the National Register of Historic Places in Hawaii
State parks of Hawaii
Beaches of Hawaii (island)
Native Hawaiian culture
National Register of Historic Places in Hawaii County, Hawaii